Pierre Péladeau,  (April 11, 1925 – December 24, 1997) was a French-Canadian businessman. He was the founder of Quebecor Inc., a Canadian media and telecommunications conglomerate in Quebec.

He was the father of billionaire Pierre Karl Péladeau, former Parti Québécois leader.

Biography
Péladeau was born in Montreal on April 11, 1925 as the youngest of seven children of Henri Péladeau, who had a successful timber business. Whilst on a sales trip to Europe in 1929, the stock market crashed and on his fathers return to Montreal he found that his two partners had taken control of the business. This event undoubtedly affected Pierre Peladeau's attitude to business and his business partners.

Péladeau had four children, Erik, Isabelle, Pierre Karl, and Anne-Marie, with his first wife, Raymonde Chopin, who died in 1976. Pierre Karl Péladeau would serve as CEO of Quebecor before serving one year as leader of the Parti Québécois from May 2015 to May 2016. Érik Péladeau served as a former Vice-Chairman of Quebecor Inc. He had two children, Simon-Pierre and Esther with his second wife, Line Parisien, whom he divorced and regretted it. Péladeau had a relationship with Manon Blanchette that produced one son and he ended his relationship with his long term partner, Anne Béland. 

Péladeau's time spent with Quebecor meant that he was often an absent father to his children.

In 1987 Péladeau told The Globe and Mail that "I've had all the women I wanted, when I wanted them." Péladeau also openly boasted that he only spoke English when he could make a profit by doing so.

In 1989, Péladeau said that women had no place on corporate boards because "they seduce too much." In 1990, Péladeau was quoted in l'Actualite magazine saying that Jews "take up too much space'" in Quebec, and was forced to issue a statement of apology claiming that he meant it in the context of Jewish fashion designers getting the lion's share of coverage from Montreal newspapers.

Education and career 
He attended College Jean-de-Brebeuf (a private school also attended by Pierre Elliott Trudeau). He then went on to complete a degree in philosophy at the Université de Montréal, and a law degree at McGill University. 

While studying for the bar exam in 1950, Péladeau purchased a struggling community paper, Le Journal de Rosemont, including their printing works, with a $1,500 loan from his mother, Elmire, which became "Nouvelles et Potins" .

In 1964, the employees of La Presse, the major Montréal French-language newspaper, went on strike, giving Péladeau the room to create his own newspaper, Le Journal de Montréal.

Quebecor 
Péladeau would create Quebecor in 1965, with Le Journal de Montréal as its flagship publication.

In 1977, Péladeau expanded Quebecor into the United States by starting a daily sports-heavy tabloid called The Philadelphia Journal, which was unsuccessful and ended its publication run in 1981. Péladeau later spoke of his failed venture and the loss of his 14 million USD investment as "the most expensive MBA in the United States." Péladeau also went on to acquire printing businesses in France and the United Kingdom, printing "Paris Match" amongst many other well known publications both in Europe and the USA.

In 1983, Quebecor bought the Winnipeg Sun.

Despite Péladeau's strong support for Quebec sovereignty, he chaired a committee in charge of organization Montreal's Canada Day celebrations in 1987.

Péladeau started The Daily News of Montreal  in 1988 in a partnership with British newspaper magnate, Robert Maxwell, but it closed two years later.

Death and honours 
Péladeau suffered a heart attack on December 24, 1997, and fell into a coma. On December 24, Péladeau died at Hotel-Dieu Hospital in Montreal at the age of 72. A private memorial ceremony for Péladeau was planned for December 29 in Sainte Adele's Pavilion des Arts.

At the time of his death, Quebecor had 6.3 billion CAD in revenue and Le Journal de Montreal was the Canadian newspaper with the third largest circulation as well as the largest French newspaper in Quebec Quebecor Printing was North America's second-largest commercial printer. Péladeau left the company to his heirs, and his son, Pierre Karl Péladeau would become president and CEO in 1999.

In 1987, Péladeau was made a Member of the Order of Canada. In 1989, he was made an Officer of the National Order of Quebec.

In 1999, Quebecor established an annual bursary for young Quebec entrepreneurs award in his name.

References 

1925 births
1997 deaths
Members of the Order of Canada
Officers of the National Order of Quebec
Quebecor people
Pierre
Quebec sovereigntists
People from Outremont, Quebec
Canadian mass media company founders
Canadian newspaper chain founders
20th-century Canadian newspaper publishers (people)
Université de Montréal alumni
McGill University Faculty of Law alumni
Burials at Notre Dame des Neiges Cemetery